Wimblington railway station was a station in the village of Wimblington, Cambridgeshire. It was closed in 1967 as part of the Beeching Axe.The station was demolished in the early 1970s and the site used for the construction of the new alignment of the A141 road.

References

External links
 Wimblington station on navigable 1946 O. S. map

Former Great Northern and Great Eastern Joint Railway stations
Disused railway stations in Cambridgeshire
Railway stations in Great Britain opened in 1848
Railway stations in Great Britain closed in 1967
Beeching closures in England
Fenland District